This section of the list of rampage killers contains those cases that occurred in Oceania and Maritime Southeast Asia.

This section does not include school massacres; workplace killings; religious, political, or racial crimes; or mass murders that took place primarily in a domestic environment, like familicides, which are covered in their own categories. Cases where the primary motive for the murders was to facilitate or cover up another felony, like robbery, are also excluded.

A rampage killer has been defined as follows:

This list should contain every case with at least one of the following features:

 Rampage killings with 6 or more dead 
 Rampage killings with at least 4 people killed and least ten victims overall (dead plus injured)
 Rampage killings with at least 2 people killed and least 12 victims overall (dead plus injured)
 An incidence of rampage killing shall not be included in this list if it does not include at least two people killed.
 In all cases the perpetrator is not counted among those killed or injured.

All abbreviations used in the table are explained below.


Rampage killers

Abbreviations and footnotes

W – A basic description of the weapons used in the murders
F – Firearms and other ranged weapons, especially rifles and handguns, but also bows and crossbows, grenade launchers, flamethrowers, or slingshots
M – Melee weapons, like knives, swords, spears, machetes, axes, clubs, rods, stones, or bare hands
O – Any other weapons, such as bombs, hand grenades, Molotov cocktails, poison and poisonous gas, as well as vehicle and arson attacks
A – indicates that an arson attack was the only other weapon used
V – indicates that a vehicle was the only other weapon used
E – indicates that explosives of any sort were the only other weapon used
P – indicates that an anaesthetising or deadly substance of any kind was the only other weapon used (includes poisonous gas)

References

Lists of criminals
rampage
Spree killers by nationality